Route 53 may refer to:

Highways

Other uses
Route 53 (WMATA), a bus route in Washington, D.C.
London Buses route 53
SEPTA Route 53 a former streetcar and current bus route in Northwest Philadelphia
Amazon Route 53, a managed DNS service